is a passenger railway station located in the city of Fuchū, Tokyo, Japan, operated by the private railway operator Keio Corporation. It is the main point of railway access to the Tokyo Racecourse.

Lines 

Services
During weekdays the station is served by two-car local trains operated to and from Higashi-Fuchū, while on weekends and holidays (as well as during events at the nearby Tokyo Racecourse) 8-car and 10-car local and express trains are operated through from the Keiō Line.

Station layout
This station has a bay platform serving two tracks.

Platforms

History
The station opened on 29 April 1955.

Passenger statistics
In fiscal 2019, the station was used by an average of 2,922 passengers daily. 

The passenger figures (boarding passengers only) for previous years are as shown below.

Surrounding area
 Tokyo Racecourse
Ōkunitama Shrine

See also
 List of railway stations in Japan

References

External links

 Keio station information 

Keio Keibajo Line
Stations of Keio Corporation
Railway stations in Tokyo
Railway stations in Japan opened in 1955
Fuchū, Tokyo